The Heroon of Trysa is the modern name for an ancient tomb, built around  in Trysa, in ancient Lycia in southwest Turkey. It was discovered in 1841 by the gymnasium teacher Julius August Schönborn during his field research in Lycia.

The figural frieze originally consisted of  plates, which decorated the square outer wall of the tomb. They are currently in the Kunsthistorisches Museum in Vienna, where they were brought in 1882 after excavations by Otto Benndorf and Felix von Luschan, with the permission of the Turkish authorities. The Kunsthistorisches Museum carried out a research project on the plates which resulted in 2015 in a published catalogue with a detailed description of each of the plates, including measurements, conservation status, and stylistic analysis of the figures, illustrated with photographs of the restored plaques.

Bibliography 
 Wolfgang Oberleitner, Das Heroon von Trysa – Ein lykisches Fürstengrab des 4.Jh.n.Chr.; Antike Welt, Sonderheft 1994
 Alice Landskron, Das Heroon von Trysa : Ein Denkmal in Lykien zwischen Ost und West : Untersuchungen zu Bildschmuck, Bauform und Grabinhaber, Vienna : Holzhausen, 2015

External links 

 Information on the Heroon of Trysa on the website of the Kunsthistorisches Museum in Vienna
 Article on the discovery and removal of the Heroon of Trysa at the World History Encyclopedia website

Cemeteries in Turkey
Lycia
Ancient Greek tombs